The 2015 Dissolution Honours List was issued on 27 August 2015 upon the advice of the Prime Minister, David Cameron. The Life Peerages were announced separately from the other appointments, while it was gazetted as a single list on 22 September 2015.

Life Peerages

Conservative Party
 Rt Hon. James Arbuthnot, to be Baron Arbuthnot of Edrom, of Edrom in the County of Berwick
 Rt Hon. Gregory Barker, to be Baron Barker of Battle, of Battle in the County of East Sussex
 Catherine Fall, to be  Baroness Fall, of Ladbroke Grove in the Royal Borough of Kensington and Chelsea
 Simone Finn, to be Baroness Finn, of Swansea in the County of West Glamorgan
 Stephen Gilbert, to be Baron Gilbert of Panteg, of Panteg in the County of Monmouthshire
 Rt Hon. William Hague , to be Baron Hague of Richmond, of Richmond in the County of North Yorkshire
 Robert Hayward , to be Baron Hayward, of Cumnor in the County of Oxfordshire
 Rt Hon. The Viscount Hailsham , to be Baron Hailsham of Kettlethorpe, of Kettlethorpe in the County of Lincolnshire
 Rt Hon. Andrew Lansley , to be Baron Lansley, of Orwell in the County of Cambridgeshire
 James Lupton , to be Baron Lupton, of Lovington in the County of Hampshire
 Ruby McGregor-Smith , to be Baroness McGregor-Smith, of Sunninghill in the Royal County of Berkshire
 Anne McIntosh, to be Baroness McIntosh of Pickering, of the Vale of York in the County of North Yorkshire
 Michelle Mone , to be Baroness Mone, of Mayfair in the City of Westminster
 James O'Shaughnessy, to be Baron O'Shaughnessy, of Maidenhead in the Royal County of Berkshire
 Emma Pidding , to be Baroness Pidding, of Amersham in the County of Buckinghamshire
 Stuart Polak , to be Baron Polak, of Hertsmere in the County of Hertfordshire
 Cllr Gary Porter, to be Baron Porter of Spalding, of Spalding in the County of Lincolnshire
 Cllr Liz Redfern, to be Baroness Redfern, of the Isle of Axholme in the County of Lincolnshire
 Rt Hon. Andrew Robathan, to be Baron Robathan, of Poultney in the County of Leicestershire
 Kate Rock, to be Baroness Rock, of Stratton in the County of Dorset
 Cllr Jane Scott , to be Baroness Scott of Bybrook, of Upper Wraxall in the County of Wiltshire
 Kevin Shinkwin, to be Baron Shinkwin, of Balham in the London Borough of Wandsworth
 Philip Smith , to be Baron Smith of Hindhead, of Hindhead in the County of Surrey
 Philippa Stroud, to be Baroness Stroud, of Fulham in the London Borough of Hammersmith and Fulham
 Rt Hon. David Willetts, to be Baron Willetts, of Havant in the County of Hampshire
 Rt Hon. Sir George Young , to be Baron Young of Cookham, of Cookham in the Royal County of Berkshire

Liberal Democrats
 Rt Hon. Sir Alan Beith, to be Baron Beith, of Berwick-upon-Tweed in the County of Northumberland
 Sharon Bowles, to be Baroness Bowles of Berkhamsted, of Bourne End in the County of Hertfordshire
 Rt Hon. Sir Malcolm Bruce, to be Baron Bruce of Bennachie, of Torphins in the County of Aberdeenshire
 Lorely Burt, to be Baroness Burt of Solihull, of Solihull in the County of West Midlands
 Rt Hon. Sir Menzies Campbell , to be Baron Campbell of Pittenweem, of Pittenweem in the County of Fife
 Rt Hon. Lynne Featherstone, to be Baroness Featherstone, of Highgate in the London Borough of Haringey
 Rt Hon. Don Foster, to be Baron Foster of Bath, of Bath in the County of Somerset
 Jonny Oates, to be Baron Oates, of Denby Grange in the County of West Yorkshire
 Shas Sheehan, to be Baroness Sheehan, of Wimbledon in the London Borough of Merton and of Tooting in the London Borough of Wandsworth
 Rt Hon. Sir Andrew Stunell , to be Baron Stunell, of Hazel Grove in the County of Greater Manchester
 Dorothy Thornhill , to be Baroness Thornhill, of Watford in the County of Hertfordshire

Labour Party
 Rt Hon. David Blunkett  to be Baron Blunkett, of Brightside and Hillsborough in the City of Sheffield
 Rt Hon. Paul Murphy, to be Baron Murphy of Torfaen, of Abersychan in the County of Gwent
 Spencer Livermore, to be Baron Livermore, of Rotherhithe in the London Borough of Southwark
 Rt Hon. Peter Hain, to be Baron Hain, of Neath in the County of West Glamorgan
 David Watts, to be Baron Watts, of Ravenhead in the County of Merseyside
 Rt Hon. Dame Dawn Primarolo , to be Baroness Primarolo, of Windmill Hill in the City of Bristol
 Rt Hon. Dame Tessa Jowell , to be Baroness Jowell, of Brixton in the London Borough of Lambeth
 Rt Hon. Alistair Darling, to be Baron Darling of Roulanish, of Great Bernera in the County of Ross and Cromarty

Knights Bachelor
 Rt Hon. Danny Alexander
 Rt Hon. Vince Cable
 Cllr Barry Norton, Honorary Alderman, West Oxfordshire District Council
 Anthony Ullman, Chairman & C.E.O., Shackletons Ltd.

The Most Excellent Order of the British Empire

Dames Commander of the Order of the British Empire (DBE)
 Rt Hon. Annette Brooke 
 Philippa Harris
 Rt Hon. Lady Hodge 
 Glenis Willmott

Commanders of the Order of the British Empire (CBE)
 Oliver Dowden 
 Jean-Christophe Gray
 Duncan Greenland
 Rupert Harrison
 Laurence Mann
 Elizabeth Sugg
 Ian Wright

Officers of the Order of the British Empire (OBE)
 Caroline Balcon
 Ramesh Chhabra
 Denzil Davidson
 Richard Duncalf 
 Clare Foges
 Ameetpal Gill
 Matthew Hanney
 Hilary Stephenson
 Benjamin Williams

Members of the Order of the British Empire (MBE)
 Margaret Binks
 Kate Marley
 Shaffaq Mohammed
 Lara Moreno-Pérez 
 Lalini Phoolchand
 Steven Pooley
 Phillipa Rudkin
 Michael Salter
 Andrew Sangar
 Ian Sherwood

British Empire Medal (BEM)
 Alison de Pass
 Paul Schooling
 Marjorie Wallace

See also 
 Dissolution of Parliament
 House of Lords
 Prime Minister of the United Kingdom

References

External links
 Downing Street announcement of Peerage creations
 Downing Street announcement of other Honours

Dissolution Honours
Dissolution Honours 2015
David Cameron
2015 awards in the United Kingdom